Flex is a 2000 video installation by the British video artist Chris Cunningham. It consists of a 15-minute film loop that endlessly depicts a naked man and woman floating in darkness, who by turns embrace and furiously beat one another, culminating in an act of anal sex during which they disappear in a blast of light. The film is set to an electronic soundtrack by Aphex Twin.

It was first displayed to the public in 2000 as part of the Apocalypse: Beauty and Horror in Contemporary Art exhibition at the Royal Academy of Arts, and subsequently at the Anthony d'Offay Gallery and other art galleries.

It was given an 18 certificate by the BBFC, with no cuts from its original form.

A 3.5-minute excerpt of the 17-minute film was released on the DVD The Work of Director Chris Cunningham.

It was also re-edited for the back-drop screen projection during Madonna's performance of "Frozen" during her Re-Invention World Tour.

An excerpt of the video was shown in the Barbican's exhibition Seduced: Art and Sex from Antiquity to Now curated by Martin Kemp, Marina Wallace and Joanne Bernstein. alongside other pieces by Bacon, Klimt, Rembrandt, Rodin and Picasso.

The man and woman are depicted by combining the performances of a number of performers and body doubles, including actors Jon and Jo Hadfield, and dancers Rob Tannion and Desiree Kongerod. Post-production work was done at Glassworks and the Moving Picture Company.

References

External links
 Anthon d'Offay Gallery press release
 Review in CIRCA art magazine, featuring stills from the film loop
 

Music videos directed by Chris Cunningham
2000 films
2000 short films
British short films
2000s English-language films